The wood sandpiper (Tringa glareola) is a small wader. This Eurasian species is the smallest of the shanks, which are mid-sized long-legged waders of the family Scolopacidae. The genus name Tringa is the New Latin name given to the green sandpiper by Aldrovandus in 1599 based on Ancient Greek trungas, a thrush-sized, white-rumped, tail-bobbing wading bird mentioned by Aristotle. The specific  glareola is from Latin glarea, " gravel".

Description and systematics
It resembles a longer-legged and more delicate green (T. ochropus) or solitary sandpiper (T. solitaria) with a short fine bill, brown back and longer yellowish legs. It differs from the first of those species in a smaller and less contrasting white rump patch, while the solitary sandpiper has no white rump patch at all.

However, it is not very closely related to these two species. Rather, its closest relative is the common redshank (T. totanus), and these two share a sister relationship with the marsh sandpiper (T. stagnatilis). These three species are a group of smallish shanks with red or yellowish legs, a breeding plumage that is generally subdued light brown above with some darker mottling and with a pattern of somewhat diffuse small brownish spots on the breast and neck.

Ecology
The wood sandpiper breeds in subarctic wetlands from the Scottish Highlands across Europe and then east across the Palearctic. They migrate to Africa, Southern Asia, particularly India, and Australia. Vagrant birds have been seen as far into the Pacific as the Hawaiian Islands. In Micronesia it is a regular visitor to the Mariana Islands (where flocks of up to 32 birds are reported) and Palau; it is recorded on Kwajalein in the Marshall Islands about once per decade. This species is encountered in the western Pacific region between mid-October and mid-May. A slight westward expansion saw the establishment of a small but permanent breeding population in Scotland since the 1950s.

This bird is usually found on freshwater during migration and wintering. They forage by probing in shallow water or on wet mud, and mainly eat insects and similar small prey. T. glareola nests on the ground or uses an abandoned old tree nest of another bird, such as the fieldfare (Turdus pilaris). Four pale green eggs are laid between March and May.

Adult wood sandpipers moult all their primary feathers between August and December, whilst immature birds moult varying number of outer primaries between December and April, much closer to their departure from Africa.  Immatures are also much more flexible than adults in the timing and rate of their moult and refueling. Adults and immatures which accumulate fuel loads of c.50% of their lean body mass can potentially cross distances of 2397–4490 km in one  non-stop flight.

The wood sandpiper is one of the species to which the Agreement on the Conservation of African-Eurasian Migratory Waterbirds (AEWA) applies.

Widespread, it is considered a Species of Least Concern by the IUCN.

References

External links

 Wood sandpiper species text in The Atlas of Southern African Birds
 Oriental Bird Images: Wood Sandpiper Selected photos
 Ageing and sexing (PDF; 1.8 MB) by Javier Blasco-Zumeta & Gerd-Michael Heinze
 
 
 
 
 
 
 

wood sandpiper
wood sandpiper
Birds of Scandinavia
Birds of Russia
wood sandpiper
wood sandpiper